The eighth season of the animated television series The Fairly OddParents first aired on Nickelodeon on February 12, 2011, with the episode "Love Triangle". The season ended on December 29, 2011. It is the only season of the series to not feature any episode segments. The season was produced by Billionfold Inc., Frederator Studios, and Nickelodeon Animation Studio.

Episodes

DVD releases

References

2011 American television seasons
2012 American television seasons
The Fairly OddParents seasons